Nineteen '90 is the second studio album from Filipina singer-actress Regine Velasquez-Alcasid in November 11, 1989. When it was released, Velasquez was a new contract artist for Vicor Music Corporation. and has signed up under Primeline Management Team under Ronnie Henares and Ida Henares. The album was recorded in Manila and was originally available in LP and cassette format. Later on, it was released in CD format.

Songs
All the materials for Nineteen '90 are original OPM songs written for Velasquez, produced by Ronnie Henares with the exception of Narito Ako which was originally done by Kundiman artist Maricris Bermont and arranged by Doming Amarillo.  This is the first time Velasquez has worked with singer-actor Ogie Alcasid, twenty-two years before they got married.

Track listing

See also
 Regine Velasquez discography
 List of best-selling albums in the Philippines

References

1989 albums
Regine Velasquez albums